Caloptilia chrysochoa is a moth of the family Gracillariidae. It is known from Samoa and Tonga.

References

chrysochoa
Moths described in 1929
Moths of Oceania